Saifi Village is an upscale residential  neighbourhood in Beirut, Lebanon. Saifi Village is located at the southeastern periphery of Centre Ville. The village is bordered by Rue Charles Debbas to the south, Rue George Haddad to the east, Rue Gouraud to the north and Rue Ariss & Kanaani to the west. Its location is at the beginning of the former Green Line which is the main frontline in Beirut during the Lebanese Civil War.

The neighborhood was completely destroyed during the war in Lebanon. However, private company Solidere has rebuilt the neighbourhood in a vernacular style that seeks to be somehow reminiscent of French colonial buildings. It was initially planned by French architect François Spoerry, and includes buildings by prominent Lebanese architects such as Nabil Gholam. Saifi Village is an  example of a New Urbanist-style neighbourhood with cobblestone streets, apartment buildings, townhouses and shops. The shops range from a combination of designer shops to car dealerships such as Ferrari. It is also the home of a few art galleries and new uprising Lebanese designer shops, including Bokja Design, Nada Debs, and Vick Vanlian Gallery. The village also includes gardens that are filled with seasonal shrubs, flowers, and trees. It is also a place for family gatherings due to the presence of children playgrounds and wooden benches and fountains for the full park experience. Extensive deployment of private security is here, however, a serious deterrent for undesired lower-income families and visitors as in other Solidere-managed development projects such as Zaytounay Bay. Every Saturday morning, farmers sell their fresh organic produce and other products at Souk el Tayeb in a little square in the village.

References

Tourist attractions in Beirut
Neighbourhoods of Beirut
New Urbanism communities